Superstar Singer is an Indian Hindi-language singing reality show that is broadcast on Sony Entertainment Television. It is aimed at kids between the ages of 7 and 15. Auditions for the second season began in January 2022.

Judges

Season 1
The first season was judged by Himesh Reshammiya, Javed Ali, Alka Yagnik.
The season premiered on 29 June 2019.

Season 2
Himesh Reshammiya, Javed Ali, and Alka Yagnik, all three judges of the first season, returned for the second season as well. The season premiered on 23 April 2022.

Seasons overview

Season 1

Super 16 Contestants
Color key
  Salman Ali's Team
  Nitin Kumar's Team
  Jyotica Tangri's Team
  Sachin Kumar Valmiki's Team

Season 2

Top 15 contestants
Color key
  Team Pawan ke Patakhe
 Team Arunita ke Ajoobe
 Team Sayli ke Soldiers
  Team Salman ke Sultans
 Team Danish ke Dabang

Team of the Week

Super Finale

Season 1
The show came to an end with a Super Finale that was scheduled to be held on 6 October 2019 on Sony TV, with six top finalists from which the winner was to be decided on the basis of public votes.

The winner, Prity Bhattachajee, was awarded the 'Superstar Singer Trophy', along with the cash prize of ₹15,00,000. Apart from this, all the six top contestants received an educational scholarship of ₹2,00,000 each.

Season 2

Season 2 came to an end with Super finale scheduled on 3 September 2022 on Sony TV, with six top finalists from which the winner was to be decided on the basis of public votes.

The winner, Mohammed faiz, was awarded the 'Superstar Singer Trophy', along with the cash prize of ₹15,00,000. Apart from this, all the six top contestants received an educational scholarship by BYJU'S of ₹5,00,000 each.Mani from Dharamkot was announced as the runner-up and Mohali's Sayisha Gupta was declared as the second runner-up.

Guests

Season 1

Season 2

References

External links
 

Hindi-language television shows
2019 Indian television series debuts
Indian reality television series
Sony Entertainment Television original programming